The 2006 CFL Draft took place on Thursday, April 20, 2006. 50 players were chosen from among eligible players from Canadian Universities across the country, as well as Canadian players playing in the NCAA. Trades that occurred with the now defunct Ottawa Renegades were still valid, adding picks to both the second and fourth rounds, but any selections that were still held by the Renegades were justly skipped. Of the 50 draft selections, 26 players were drafted from Canadian Interuniversity Sport institutions.

Round one

Round two

Round three

Round four

Round five

Round six

References

Further reading
 
 
 
 The 2006 Draft list at CFL.ca

Canadian College Draft